Shovel Creek may refer to:

Shovel Creek (Alaska), a stream in Alaska
Shovel Creek (Snake River), a stream in Washington